Maenchen is a surname. Notable persons with the surname include:

John Eric Maenchen, American engineer
Otto J. Maenchen-Helfen (1894–1969), Austrian academic